Patricia Byrne may refer to:

Patricia Byrne (writer) (born 1950), Irish writer
Patricia M. Byrne (1925–2007), American diplomat
Patsy Byrne (1933–2014), English actress